Quintilianus and may refer to:

 Aristides Quintilianus (3rd century), Greek writer
 Marcus Fabius Quintilianus ( 35– 100), Roman rhetorician